The Tolpatches were Hungarian foot soldiers in the 17th and 18th centuries.

See also
 Bashibazouk

Hungarian soldiers